Delta pyriforme is a species of potter wasp in the subfamily Eumeninae of the family Vespidae.

References

Potter wasps
Insects described in 1775
Taxa named by Johan Christian Fabricius